Lucy Renshall (born 11 December 1995) is a British judoka, who competed at the 2020 Summer Olympics held in Tokyo, Japan.

Judo career
Renshall is a four times champion of Great Britain, winning the half-middleweight division at the British Judo Championships in 2015, 2016, 2017 and 2021.

In 2020, she was selected to represent Great Britain at the 2020 Summer Olympics in Tokyo, where she competed in the women's 63 kg category.

She is the 2021 Judo Grand Slam Antalya champion in the -63 kg class. She also won the gold medal in her event at the 2021 Judo Grand Slam Baku held in Baku, Azerbaijan. She repeated this at the 2021 Judo Grand Slam Abu Dhabi held in Abu Dhabi, United Arab Emirates.

References

External links
 
 

1995 births
Living people
English female judoka
Judoka at the 2019 European Games
European Games competitors for Great Britain
Judoka at the 2020 Summer Olympics
Olympic judoka of Great Britain